Sunday League may refer to:

Sunday League (cricket), the precursor tournament to the National League in English cricket
Sunday league football, amateur football played on Sundays in the United Kingdom
Sunday Football League, former semi-professional Australian rules football league